American Story is an American anthology media franchise consisting of several television series created by Ryan Murphy and Brad Falchuk for the cable network FX and FX on Hulu. Each series follows a different genre of fiction, with each individual season conceived as a self-contained miniseries, following a different set of characters and settings, and a story line with its own "beginning, middle, and end." Some plot elements of each season and series are loosely inspired by true events. Many actors appear in more than one season and series, often playing a new character.

Actors who have appeared in two or more instalments of the franchise include: Sarah Paulson; Cuba Gooding Jr.; Connie Britton; Darren Criss; Finn Wittrock; Jon Jon Briones; Billy Eichner; Matt Bomer, who directed an episode of American Crime Story; Kaia Gerber; Naomi Grossman; Chad James Buchanan; John Carroll Lynch; Dylan McDermott; Charles Melton; Billie Lourd; Jamie Brewer; Naomi Campbell who appears in the form of archive audio in American Crime Story; Celia Finkelstein; Blake Shields; John Lacy; Nico Greetham; Teddy Sears; Judith Light; Rebecca Dayan; Matt Lasky; Cameron Cowperthwaite; Spencer Neville; Denis O'Hare and Gabourey Sidibe. Cody Fern and Max Greenfield have appeared in all three installments.

The American Story franchise has received widespread critical acclaim, winning several Emmy Awards.

Background

Creators Murphy and Falchuk began working on American Horror Story before their Fox series Glee began production. Murphy wanted to do the opposite of what he had done previously and thus began his work on the series. He stated: "I went from Nip/Tuck to Glee, so it made sense that I wanted to do something challenging and dark. And I always had loved, as Brad had, the horror genre. So it just was a natural for me." Falchuk was intrigued by the idea of putting a different angle on the horror genre, stating that their main goal in creating the series was to scare viewers. "You want people to be a little bit off balance afterwards," he said.

In February 2011, FX officially announced that it had ordered a pilot for a possible series from Ryan Murphy and Brad Falchuk, with both Murphy and Falchuk writing and Murphy directing. Dante Di Loreto was announced as executive producer. Production on the series began in April 2011. In July 2011, FX officially announced the project had been picked up to become a full series.

From the beginning, Murphy and Falchuk planned that each season of the series would tell a different story. After the first-season finale aired, Murphy spoke of his plans to change the cast and location for the second season. He did say, however, that some actors who starred in the first season would be returning. "The people that are coming back will be playing completely different characters, creatures, monsters, etc. [The Harmons'] stories are done. People who are coming back will be playing entirely new characters," he announced. In November 2012, FX chief executive, John Landgraf, described the unique format of the series stating: "[T]he notion of doing an anthological series of miniseries with a repertory cast—has proven groundbreaking, wildly successful and will prove to be trendsetting."

On October 7, 2014, it was announced that FX had ordered a 10-episode companion series titled American Crime Story, developed by Scott Alexander and Larry Karaszewski. While each season of American Horror Story focuses on a new horror theme, each season of American Crime Story focuses on a new true crime story. On May 11, 2020, Murphy revealed that a spin-off series named American Horror Stories was being developed; it will feature self-contained anthological episodes, instead of a season-long story arc as featured in American Horror Story. It was set to air on FX.

On August 13, 2021, it was announced that FX had ordered a new spin-off series American Love Story. The first installment will depict the whirlwind courtship and marriage of John F. Kennedy Jr. and Carolyn Bessette-Kennedy. On the same day, it was announced that FX had ordered a new spin-off limited series American Sports Story. The first installment, based on the podcast Gladiator: Aaron Hernandez and Football Inc. from The Boston Globe and Wondery, will focus on the rise and fall of former NFL player Aaron Hernandez.

Television series

American Horror Story (2011–present)

In February 2011, FX officially announced that it had ordered a pilot for a possible series from Ryan Murphy and Brad Falchuk, with both Murphy and Falchuk writing and Murphy directing. Dante Di Loreto was announced as executive producer. Production on the series began in April 2011. In July 2011, FX officially announced the project had been picked up to become a full series.

Each season of American Horror Story focuses on a new horror theme. The series premiered on October 5, 2011, and is broadcast on the cable television channel FX in the United States. In November 2011, it premiered internationally on the respective countries' Fox Networks Group.The first season, retroactively subtitled Murder House, takes place in Los Angeles, California in 2011.It premiered on October 5, 2011, and concluded on December 21, 2011. The second season, subtitled Asylum, takes place in Massachusetts in 1964 which  premiered on October 17, 2012. The third season, subtitled Coven, takes place in New Orleans, Louisiana in 2013 which premiered on October 9, 2013. The fourth season, subtitled Freak Show, takes place in Jupiter, Florida in 1952 which premiered on October 8, 2014. The fifth season, subtitled Hotel, takes place in Los Angeles, California in 2015 which premiered on October 7, 2015. The sixth season, subtitled Roanoke, takes place in North Carolina during 2014–2016 which premiered on September 14, 2016. The seventh season, subtitled Cult, takes place in the fictional suburb of Brookfield Heights, Michigan, during 2016–2017 which premiered on September 5, 2017. The eighth season, subtitled Apocalypse, features the return of the witches from Coven as they battle the Antichrist from Murder House in an attempt to prevent the apocalypse which premiered on September 12, 2018. The ninth season, subtitled 1984, takes place outside of Los Angeles during the 1980s which premiered on September 18, 2019. The tenth season, subtitled Double Feature, includes two parts, and the first one takes place in 2021, focusing on a family who moves to Provincetown, Massachusetts, where the strange inhabitants begin to make an impact on their lives. In the second part, a group of students on a camping trip finds themselves embroiled in a terrifying and deadly conspiracy that has been preparing for decades which premiered on August 25, 2021.The eleventh season, subtitled NYC, takes place in 1980s New York City, and focuses on a string of killings involving gay men, as well as the emergence of a new virus which premiered on October 19, 2022. In January 2020, FX renewed the series for an additional three seasons, including the eleventh season, bringing it to at least thirteen confirmed seasons.

American Crime Story (2016–present)

FX announced an order for a 10-episode companion series American Crime Story in October 2014, developed by Scott Alexander and Larry Karaszewski. Substituting a new horror theme for each season,  American Crime Story focuses on a new true crime story. The series features American Horror Story cast members Sarah Paulson, Connie Britton, Cuba Gooding Jr., Darren Criss, Finn Wittrock, Max Greenfield, Jon Jon Briones, Cody Fern, and Billy Eichner.

The first season The People v. O. J. Simpson premiered in February 2016. The second season The Assassination of Gianni Versace premiered in January 2018. The third season Impeachment premiered in September 2021. A potential fourth season, tentatively focusing on the rise and fall of Studio 54 owners Steve Rubell and Ian Schrager, is currently in development.

American Horror Stories (2021–present)

On May 11, 2020, Murphy revealed that a spin-off series named American Horror Stories was being developed; it will feature self-contained anthological episodes, instead of a season-long story arc as featured in American Horror Story. On June 22, 2020, it was announced that American Horror Stories would stream on FX on Hulu. American Horror Stories premiered on July 15, 2021, and its first season consists of seven episodes. On August 13, 2021, the series was renewed for a second season, Which premiered on July 21, 2022, and consists of eight episodes.

Matt Bomer, Gavin Creel, Sierra McCormick, Paris Jackson, Belissa Escobedo, Merrin Dungey, Selena Sloan, Valerie Loo, Ashley Martin Carter, Kaia Gerber, Aaron Tveit and Celia Finkelstein starred in the first two episodes. Other American Horror Story alums who appeared in the first season include Naomi Grossman, John Carroll Lynch, Charles Melton, Billie Lourd, Chad James Buchanan, Cody Fern, Dylan McDermott and Jamie Brewer along with newcomers Rhenzy Feliz, Madison Bailey, Ben J. Pierce, Leonardo Cecchi, Kyle Red Silverstein, Amy Grabow, Adrienne Barbeau, Kevin McHale, Nico Greetham, Dyllón Burnside, Taneka Johnson, Danny Trejo, Ronen Rubinstein, Virginia Gardner, Vanessa E. Williams, Michael B. Silver, Kimberley Drummond, Jake Choi, Misha Gonz-Cirkl, Tiffany Dupont, Blake Shields, Colin Tandberg, Mercedes Mason, Noah Cyrus, Adam Hagenbuch, John Brotherton, Nicolas Bechtel and Tom Lenk.

Nico Greetham and Cody Fern returned for the second season. Denis O'Hare, Matt Lasky, Gabourey Sidibe, Max Greenfield, Austin Woods, Seth Gabel, Rebecca Dayan, Cameron Cowperthwaite, Spencer Neville and Teddy Sears, who appeared in previous seasons of  American Horror Story, will also appear in the second season along with newcomers Kristine Froseth, Houston Jax Towe, Abby Corrigan, Simone Recasner, Maryssa Menendez, Emily Morales-Cabrera, Caitlin Dulany, Joel Swetow, Lily Rohren, Vince Yap, Nancy Linehan Charles, Bella Thorne, Anthony De La Torre, Billie Bodega, Addison Timlin, Julia Schlaepfer, Ian Sharkey, Dominique Jackson, Quvenzhané Wallis, Raven Scott, Kyla Drew, Kyanna Simone, Shane Callahan, Ryan D. Madison, Tiffany Yvonne Cox, Judith Light, Britt Lower, Todd Waring, Cornelia Guest, Madison Iseman, Jeff Doucette, Sara Silva, Jessika Van, Chelsea M. Davis, Alicia Silverstone, Olivia Rouyre, Bobby Hogan, Heather Wynters and Jarrod Crawford.

American Love Story
On August 13, 2021, it was announced that FX had ordered a new spin-off series American Love Story. The first installment will depict the whirlwind courtship and marriage of John F. Kennedy Jr. and Carolyn Bessette-Kennedy.

American Sports Story
On August 13, 2021, it was announced that FX had ordered a new spin-off limited series American Sports Story. The first installment, based on the podcast Gladiator: Aaron Hernandez and Football Inc. from The Boston Globe and Wondery, will focus on the rise and fall of former NFL player Aaron Hernandez. In January 2023, it was reported that the series was "heading toward production". Principal photography is scheduled to begin on April 3, 2023, in Jersey City, New Jersey.

Reception

Merchandise

Promotion
As part of the promotion for American Horror Story, FX launched a "House Call" campaign, in which viewers at home could sign up and come face-to-face with a character from the series. Prior to the series premiere, FX released several clues to shine light on the series. They were offered on the show's official YouTube channel. Ten clues were released. In September 2011, FX launched a website which allows visitors to tour the Murder House throughout the decades and look for clues.

In August 2012, the first promo for the second season was released on the American Horror Story Facebook page entitled "Special Delivery", in which a nun carries a couple of buckets filled with body parts through a field. As a church bell rings, the nun empties one bucket's bloody contents, leaving the empty bucket behind, and resumes her trek. Over 20 subsequent teasers were released. Four photos were also released on EW.com. Two televised teasers, titled "Meet the Residents", were released on August 31, 2012. They feature the patients and some staff (such as Dr. Thredson, played by Zachary Quinto, and Sister Mary Eunice, played by Lily Rabe) lying in twin beds and dealing with their individual issues as the heads of the asylum (Jessica Lange, Joseph Fiennes and James Cromwell) look on. The song "Que Sera, Sera", mixed with the show's theme music, plays. To promote Cult, a competition was set up where fans who donated to the Children's Hospital Los Angeles could get a chance to get a walk-on role in an episode, and lunch with Evan Peters.

Universal's Halloween Horror Nights
On August 16, 2016, FX announced a deal had been struck to feature an American Horror Story maze at Universal Studios Hollywood and Universal Orlando for their Halloween Horror Nights events. The maze featured sets and themes from Murder House, Freak Show, and Hotel. Universal Parks & Resorts said of the experience, "Twisted scenes from Murder House will unleash the evil spirits that possess the Harmon estate, spiraling guests through decades of the tortured dead who previously resided there. In Freak Show, guests joined a troupe of biological misfits in a sinister sideshow where they were stalked by the murderous and deformed Twisty the Clown. Finally, guests succumbed to the warped desires of the Countess after checking into the haunted Hotel Cortez, conceived from the beginning as a torture chamber for its customers." In 2017, the show returned as haunted attractions to both parks, with Universal Orlando having an attraction based on Asylum, Coven, and Roanoke, and Universal Studios Hollywood basing their attraction solely on Roanoke.

In December 2017, The Walt Disney Company announced it would purchase 21st Century Fox which included the 20th Century Fox film and TV assets. The deal was completely finalized on March 20, 2019, making 20th Century Fox officially part of The Walt Disney Studios. As Disney and Universal are bitter rivals in the theme park business (especially for their Central Florida properties), this would likely end the franchise's presence in Halloween Horror Nights at Universal parks.

The Night Bites Bakery
On July 14, 2021 an American Horror Story themed bakery opened in New York's Meatpacking District in Manhattan until July 24, 2021 to celebrate the release of spin-off American Horror Stories and the tenth season. Guests had to be over the age of 18 to enter the bakery. Guests also had to make reservations for 30 minute visits. It featured sweet treats inspired by the series, as well as unique designs and characters based on past installments of American Horror Story and American Horror Stories. After placing an order, the Rubber Woman, introduced in the first episode of American Horror Stories, delivered the order through a secret window. It opened in Los Angeles from August 4, 2021 until August 14, 2021 in Beverly Grove. The bakery opened in Provincetown, Massachusetts, where the first part of the tenth season were filmed, at Pat's Happy Park on September 1, 2021 till September 4, 2021.

Notes

References

External links

20th Television franchises
 
American horror fiction television series
 
American anthology television series
Mass media franchises introduced in 2011
Serial killers in television
Sororicide in fiction
Television franchises
20th Century Studios franchises
Television series about extraterrestrial life
Television series set in the 2010s
Television shows adapted into comics
Television shows adapted into video games